Stéphanie Mbole Mika (born 10 October 1990), known as Stéphanie Mbole, is a DR Congolese footballer who plays as a goalkeeper. She has been a member of the DR Congo women's national team.

International career
Mbole capped for the DR Congo at senior level during the 2012 African Women's Championship.

See also
 List of Democratic Republic of the Congo women's international footballers

References

External links

1990 births
Living people
Women's association football goalkeepers
Democratic Republic of the Congo women's footballers
Democratic Republic of the Congo women's international footballers
Democratic Republic of the Congo expatriate footballers
Democratic Republic of the Congo expatriate sportspeople in Angola
Expatriate women's footballers in Angola